This article details the Toronto Wolfpack's rugby league football club's 2020 season. This is the Wolfpack's fourth season overall and the club started its first season in the Super League.  The COVID-19 pandemic saw the season suspended after round 7 on 15 March 2020.  The season did not resume until August and the mounting financial pressures on the club forced the club's management to withdraw the team from the 2020 Super League season on 20 July. Super League expunged the teams completed results from the season's results although individual player statistics such as appearances and points scored will still be recorded.  At the time the season was suspended the team were bottom of Super League with a 0–6 record.

2020 squad

Fixtures and results

Pre-season friendlies

Challenge Cup

Super League 
These results were expunged and will not be recorded in the Super League statistics however individual statistics will remain official.

Player statistics
As of 11 March 2020

2020 transfers

In

Out

Milestones
Round 1: James Cunningham, Brad Singleton and Sonny Bill Williams made their debuts for the Wolfpack.
Round 2: Brad Singleton scored his 1st try for the Wolfpack.
Round 4: Tony Gigot made his debut for the Wolfpack.
Round 5: Jack Wells made his debut for the Wolfpack.
Round 6: Jack Wells scored his 1st try for the Wolfpack.

References

External links 
Toronto Wolfpack

Super League XXV by club
Toronto Wolfpack seasons
2020 in Canadian rugby league